Gendukh is a rural locality (a selo) in Gvedyshsky Selsoviet, Tlyaratinsky District, Republic of Dagestan, Russia. The population was 285 as of 2010.

Geography 
Gendukh is located 7 km northeast of Tlyarata (the district's administrative centre) by road. Gvedysh is the nearest rural locality.

References 

Rural localities in Tlyaratinsky District